Andre D'Juan Daniels (born March 31, 1986), better known by his stage name Add-2, sometimes stylized as Add 2, is an American rapper who first gained popularity after the release of his second mixtape, A Tale of Two's City: Volume 2. In 2009, his single "Luxury" was featured on MTV, MtvU's top 5 freshman and Vh1 respectively. "Luxury" is part of Add-2's third mixtape, "Tale of Two's City Vol. 3: The Rise & Fall." Add-2 has also worked with Grammy award winning music producer 9th Wonder along with Kendrick Lamar, The Roots and Gerald Walker.

Discography

Studio albums 
 Prey For the Poor (2015)
 Jim Crow: The Musical (2019)

Collaborative albums 
 Between Heaven & Hell (with Khrysis) (2013)

Mixtapes 
 Tale Of Two's City Vol. 1 (2005)
 Tale Of Two's City Vol. 2: The Return Of The Menace (2007)
 Coast 2 Coast Exclusives Vol. 5 (2008)
 Tale Of Two's City Vol. 3: The Rise & Fall (2009)
 Tale Of Two's City Vol. 4: Better Days (2010)
 One Missed Call (2011)
 Save.Our.Souls (2012)
 More Missed Calls (2013)

Guest Appearances
 2010: "Ghetto Tekz Runnin' It" DJ Rashad featuring Add-2
 2013: "Set It Off" Slot-A featuring Add-2
 2013: "I Wish Too (PSA)" Ben Official featuring Add-2
 2014: "Wreckin Crew" Dizzy Wright featuring Add-2 & Bishop Nehru
 2014: "Regular Days" Ether Q featuring Add-2 & Mike Kozitka
 2016: "Mace Windu" Noveliss featuring Add-2
 2016: "Nocturnal Youth" Lucius P. Thundercat featuring Ransom & Add-2
 2017: "Pursuit of Success" K Noble featuring Add-2
 2017: "Victory" Bennett Sully featuring Add-2 & Defcee
 2018: "Live & Learn" J.R. Miller featuring Add-2

References

1986 births
African-American male rappers
American male rappers
Living people
Rappers from Chicago
21st-century American rappers
21st-century American male musicians
21st-century African-American musicians
20th-century African-American people
Pigface members